Subhan Farmayil oglu Aliyev (born 15 October 1981) is an Azerbaijani lawyer who is an Associate Professor of the Department of Constitutional Law at Baku State University Law School (since 2013), Doctor of Law, Head of the Department of State and Constitutional Law of the ANAS Institute on Law and Human Rights (since 2020), and Member of the Azerbaijani Bar Association.

Biography
Subhan Aliyev was born in Baku on 15 October 1981. He is married, with two children.

Education 
Aliyev received his primary and secondary education in high school #245 of Baku. He enrolled in Baku State University Law School in 1998 on a free basis. After graduation, Aliyev continued his education at the same faculty and received a master's degree in Public Law in 2005.

Afterward, Aliyev continued his studies at the Department of Constitutional Law of the Baku State University Law School, firstly postgraduate studies from 2005 to 2010, and then doctoral studies from 2012 to 2018.

Scientific activity 
In 2010, Aliyev successfully completed his thesis and defended a dissertation on Organizational and legal forms of local self-government of the Republic of Azerbaijan. Afterward, on June 22, 2011, Aliyev was awarded the degree of Ph.D. in Law.

In 2013, he was elected an Associate Professor of the Department of Constitutional Law, and in 2015, by the decision of the Supreme Attestation Commission under the President of the Republic of Azerbaijan, he was awarded the scientific title of Associate Professor.

In 2018, he defended his doctoral dissertation on Internal mechanisms for the implementation of international law in the field of human rights and in 2019, by the decision of the Supreme Attestation Commission under the President of the Republic of Azerbaijan, he was awarded the degree of Doctor of Law.

Aliyev is specialized in administrative law, administrative procedure law, parliamentary law, constitutional law, advocacy, and local government law.

Career 
Subhan Aliyev has been working as a teacher at the Department of Constitutional Law of the Baku State University Law School since September 5, 2006, and teaches "Administrative Law", "Comparative Administrative Law", "Fundamentals of Law", "Administrative Procedure Law", "Civil Service".  He has been teaching "Administrative Law" and "Administrative Procedure Law" in the "SABAH" groups of the Ministry of Education since 2015, and in the Academy of the State Customs Committee of the Republic of Azerbaijan since 2018.

Aliyev also participated as an expert-lawyer during the adoption of the decisions of the Plenum of the Constitutional Court on the approval and official announcement of the results of the 2013 Azerbaijani presidential election, the results of the 2015 parliamentary elections, as well as the interpretation of many legislative acts.

Since 2015, Aliyev has been conducting training on "Administrative Law" at the Academy of Justice for those admitted to the Ministry of Justice, judges, and lawyers. Among the people trained by Subhan Aliyev, there are employees of the State Migration Service.

Subhan Aliyev is a member of the Azerbaijani Bar Association,  and the head of the Department of State and Constitutional Law of the Institute of Law and Human Rights of ANAS since 2020.

References

External links 

 
 
 Baku State University Law School — Subhan Aliyev 

1981 births
Living people
Baku State University alumni
Academic staff of Baku State University
21st-century Azerbaijani lawyers